The Maymandzhin Range is a mountain range in Magadan Oblast, Far Eastern Federal District, Russia.

One of the possible routes of the projected Lena-Kamchatka railway line is across the Maymandzhin Range.

Geography
The Maymandzhin Range rises at the western limit of the Kolyma Highlands system.

The range is located in the interfluve of the Bakhapcha and Buyunda rivers, both right tributaries of the Kolyma flowing northwards. The Olsky Plateau lies at the southern end.  high Mount Khetinskaya (Гора Хетинская) rises to the northwest, beyond the northern end of the range, and to the west lie the Upper Kolyma Highlands.

Hydrography
The Yama has its sources in the southwestern slopes of the Maymandzhin Range and the Buyunda and Nyavlenga at the southern end, in the Kilgan Massif. The Talaya, a tributary of the Buyunda, and the Nerega, a tributary of the Bakhapcha, have their sources on the northeastern slopes. The Maltan, another tributary of the Bakhapcha, flows northwards, below the western slopes.

See also
List of mountains and hills of Russia

References

External links
Первым геологам Колымы | Актуально - Вечерний Магадан
SE - Kolyma - Колымское нагорье
С Чукотки на Колыму. Несуществующая дорога жизни
АНАЛИЗ ФАУНЫ И НАСЕЛЕНИЯ ПТИЦ ЮЖНЫХ ОТРОГОВ КОЛЫМСКОГО НАГОРЬЯ
Mountain ranges of Magadan Oblast
Kolyma Mountains